A Sideman's Journey is the first solo album by German musician and artist Klaus Voormann, released in July 2009. Voormann is best known as the creator of the cover art for The Beatles' album Revolver as well as for being a much-in-demand session musician during the 1970s. He played bass on a large number of well-known albums by ex-Beatles John Lennon, George Harrison and Ringo Starr − including All Things Must Pass, Imagine and The Concert for Bangladesh − and by artists such as Harry Nilsson, Doris Troy, Lou Reed, Gary Wright, Carly Simon and Randy Newman. Before then, Voormann had been a member of the 1960s pop group Manfred Mann. A Sideman's Journey is notable for including performances by Paul McCartney, Ringo Starr and Yusuf Islam (Cat Stevens), among others.

Contributors
The album features cameos by musicians Voormann had worked with in the past, as well as remakes of songs that he contributed to back in the late '60s and the '70s. Three songs by his late friend George Harrison are included, as is a track Voormann co-wrote with soul singer Doris Troy for the latter's 1970 album on The Beatles' Apple label. Paul McCartney sings and plays all instruments except bass guitar on the opening track, "I'm in Love Again", with additional drumming by Ringo Starr. Yusuf Islam (formerly known as Cat Stevens) sings and plays guitar on "All Things Must Pass" and "The Day the World Gets Round". Bonnie Bramlett provides vocals on "My Sweet Lord" and "So Far". Ringo Starr plays drums on two of the tracks, but he declined an offer to sing his trademark song, "You're Sixteen"; Voormann instead selected a younger singer (Max Buskohl) to do the vocals, and to ensure that A Sideman's Journey would include musicians from all age groups. Most  of  Voormann's old band Manfred Mann now  performing  as  The Manfreds, re-recorded their 1968 hit single "The Mighty Quinn".

Track listing
"I'm in Love Again" (feat. Paul McCartney and Ringo Starr) (Dave Bartholomew, Fats Domino) – 2:05
"Blue Suede Shoes" (feat. Don Preston) (Carl Perkins) – 3:07 
"All Things Must Pass" (feat. Yusuf Islam) (George Harrison) – 3:02 
"Have You Seen My Baby" (feat. John Fohl) (Randy Newman) – 5:12 
"My Sweet Lord"  (feat. Bonnie Bramlett) (Harrison) – 3:35
"The Mighty Quinn" (feat. The Manfreds) (Bob Dylan) – 3:06
"Short People" (feat. Don Preston) (Randy Newman) – 3:13
"The Day the World Gets 'Round" (feat. Yusuf Islam) (Harrison) – 2:47 
"So Far" (feat. Bonnie Bramlett) (Doris Troy, Voormann) – 3:41
"You're Sixteen" (feat. Max Buskohl and Ringo Starr) (Sherman/Sherman) – 2:39
"Such a Night" (feat. Dr. John) (Mac Rebennack) 5:52

Deluxe edition (CD):
"I'm in Love Again" (feat. Paul McCartney and Ringo Starr) (Dave Bartholomew, Fats Domino) – 2:05
"So Far" (feat. Bonnie Bramlett) (Doris Troy, Voormann) – 3:41
"Blue Suede Shoes" (feat. Don Preston) (Carl Perkins) – 3:07 
"All Things Must Pass" (feat. Yusuf Islam) (George Harrison) – 3:02 
"Have You Seen My Baby" (feat. John Fohl) (Randy Newman) – 5:12 
"My Sweet Lord"  (feat. Bonnie Bramlett) (Harrison) – 3:35
"The Mighty Quinn" (feat. The Manfreds) (Bob Dylan) – 3:06
"Short People" (feat. Don Preston) (Randy Newman) – 3:13
"The Day the World Gets 'Round" (feat. Yusuf Islam) (Harrison) – 2:47 
"Mocking Bird" (feat. Bonnie Bramlett & Don Nix)
Just Like a Woman (feat. The Manfreds)
"You're Sixteen" (feat. Max Buskohl and Ringo Starr) (Sherman/Sherman) – 2:39
"Such a Night" (feat. Dr. John) (Mac Rebennack) 5:52
"He Needs Me" (feat. Inara George) (Harry Nilsson)

Deluxe edition bonus DVD:
"Making Of - A Spectacular Recording Session With More Than 30 Artists" (70 min.)
"Voormann & Friends for Charity - Water is Life"
"With A Little Help From My Friend Gregor"

Personnel

Musicians 

 Klaus Voormann – bass guitar, backing vocals, liner notes, upright bass, design 
 Bonnie Bramlett – vocals 
 Max Buskohl – vocals, backing vocals 
 Carl Carlton – acoustic guitar, electric guitar, backing vocals, slide guitar  
 Mike D'Abo – organ, vocals  
 Cassiano De Sa  – acoustic guitar , electric guitar 
 Dr. John – piano, vocals    
 John Fohl – electric guitar, vocals  
 Grant Geissman – acoustic guitar, electric guitar 
 Kelvin Holly – electric guitar
 David Hood – bass guitar  
 Mike Hugg – piano  
 Yusuf Islam – acoustic guitar, vocals, backing vocals
 Jackie Johnson – backing vocals
 Paul Jones – backing vocals
 Jim Keltner – drums  
 Trevor Lawrence – saxophone  
 Albert Lee – electric guitar  
 Susan Marshall – backing vocals  
 Paul McCartney – organ, acoustic guitar, piano, drums, electric guitar, vocals  
 Tom McGuinness – electric guitar, backing vocals 
 Van Dyke Parks – piano, keyboards    
 Luke Potashnick – acoustic guitar, electric guitar, backing vocals 
 Steve Potts – drums  
 Don Preston – electric guitar, vocals   
 Kristoffer Sonne – percussion, drums, backing vocals
 Ringo Starr – drums  
 Rick Steff – organ, piano, accordion, electric piano
 Nikolaj Torp – keyboards, backing vocals
 Rob Townsend – drums   
 Ruscha Voormann – backing vocals
 Joe Walsh – electric guitar
 Joel Williams – drums

Additional Personnel 

 Maryann Baker – assistant engineer    
 Adam Hill – engineer  
 Iain Hill – engineer  
 Thomas Juth – mixing  
 Jamie Kirkham – engineer  
 Eddie Klein – engineer  
 Jason Latshaw – engineer  
 Adam Miller – assistant engineer    
 Kevin Nix – mastering  
 Larry Nix – mastering  
 Rich Niles – engineer    
 Lee Slater – engineer
 Christina Voormann – liner notes  
 Stefan Zaradic – engineer  

2009 debut albums
Klaus Voormann albums
Albums with cover art by Klaus Voormann
Universal Music Group albums